Frenchy and the Punk are a Euro-American Acoustic Alternative post-punk cabaret duo based in New York City. They were listed in the top 25 duos in May 2012 by Yahoo Music Blog's List of the Day. Punk guitarist Scott Helland, originally from the bands Deep Wound and Outpatients, formed Frenchy and the Punk with singer Samantha Stephenson in 2005. The group was originally called The Gypsy Nomads. They adopted their nickname Frenchy and the Punk prior to their first European tour in 2011.

Sound and style

Their sound has "elements of cabaret, gypsy and rock"  on par with The Dresden Dolls and Gogol Bordello and Stephenson's vocal style has drawn comparisons to Siouxsie Sioux from Siouxsie and the Banshees. Guitarist Scott Helland is known for creating a wall of sound onstage and has been "using looping guitar techniques since the 90s"   Another facet to Frenchy and the Punk's sound is their drum instrumentals that mix a Taiko-esque feel with a Carnival of Rio intensity.

French connection

Stephenson was born in Lyon, France  and her autobiographical song "Yes! I’m French" offers the witty line "When those jokers served up freedom fries / I saw Lady Liberty rolling her eyes." They released the all French CD Eternal Summer in 2008 with Samantha "crooning sultry, original French pop tunes in a classy cabaret fashion."

Punk connection

Guitarist Scott Helland was a founding member of the legendary Massachusetts hardcore punk bands Deep Wound with J Mascis and Lou Barlow and Outpatients in the early eighties. He was also a member of the NYC Hardcore bands School of Violence and Darkside NYC in the nineties. He began releasing solo instrumental records in 1996 and started the all instrumental spy noir, surf themed project Guitarmy of One which has released 2 albums in the late 2000s.

2014 and beyond 

In 2014, after the release of their 4th full length album Bonjour Batfrog, Frenchy and the Punk performed at Scotland's prestigious Edinburgh Fringe Fest.

In 2016, they performed in England, Canada and across the US. In 2019 they performed in West Africa in Grand Lahou, Ivory Coast. The duo has been touring year-round since 2005.

In January 2019 they released a video for the song Lanky Bell Bottoms from their forth-coming album Hooray Beret. The 10 song album was released in April 2019 with 3 music videos for the songs 'Sing', 'Wah', 'Lanky Bell Bottoms' and 2 lyric videos for 'Monsters' and 'Fastball'.

Discography
See also Scott Helland

Albums

Featured in compilations
"Blood in the Sky Steampunk Compilation CD" (2012-Frenchy and the Punk)
"The Artifice Club Audio Companion" CD (2013-Frenchy and the Punk)

See also
 List of steampunk works: Steampunk musicians

References

External links
 Official Frenchy and the Punk website

Steampunk
Steampunk music
American musical duos
Rock music duos